Chris Kropman (10 October 1919 – 29 March 2003) was a Dutch cyclist. He competed in the team pursuit event at the 1936 Summer Olympics.

See also
 List of Dutch Olympic cyclists

References

External links
 

1919 births
2003 deaths
Dutch male cyclists
Olympic cyclists of the Netherlands
Cyclists at the 1936 Summer Olympics
Sportspeople from Nijmegen
Cyclists from Gelderland